Dale Lindsey Whittington (September 23, 1959June 14, 2003), was an American racing driver. Born in Farmington, New Mexico, he was the youngest of four sons born to 1950s race car owner Dick Whittington. Dale Whittington had 3 sons: R.D Whittington, Dale Lindsey Whittington Jr, Blake Whittington.  Dale Whittington has one grandson Dale Whittington III. Whittington was not married at the time of his death.

Indy 500
Despite having little oval experience, Whittington entered the 1982 Indianapolis 500, joining his brothers Bill and Don to become the only trio of siblings to qualify for the same race at Indy. He qualified 23rd, on the eighth row.

On race day, he found himself caught up in the infamous Kevin Cogan crash. During the final pace lap, just before the green flag was to drop on the frontstretch, Kevin Cogan struck A. J. Foyt, and then Mario Andretti. As the field checked up to avoid the carnage, Whittington locked his brakes and spun into Roger Mears, a driver in the sixth row. All four drivers were eliminated from the race. Dale was out of the race having never taken the green flag, and never again managed to qualify at Indy.

Later years
Whittington was not involved with the 1980s IMSA Camel GT drug smuggling scandal which involved his brothers (Bill and Don) as well as Randy Lanier, John Paul Sr., and John Paul Jr. Both of his brothers received prison time.

Whittington transitioned to endurance racing, competing in the ALMS series, as well as competing at the 24 Hours of Daytona in 1999 and 2000. He competed in Grand-Am in 2001 often racing with his brother, Don.

Whittington was a developer responsible for developing Tampa Bay Golf and Tennis and later worked at World Jet owned by his brother Don at Fort Lauderdale Executive Airport (FXE). He died on June 14, 2003. He was found dead by his oldest son.

Motorsports career results

American Open Wheel racing results
(key)

Complete USAC Mini-Indy Series results

Indianapolis 500

Complete 24 Hours of Le Mans results
(key)

References

External links
 

1959 births
2003 deaths
Indianapolis 500 drivers
Drug-related deaths in Florida
24 Hours of Le Mans drivers
American Le Mans Series drivers
Sportspeople from Orlando, Florida
Racing drivers from Florida
World Sportscar Championship drivers

Team Joest drivers